Buchanan Point is a headland  north-west of Cape Dundas and  south-east of Mackintosh Cove, at the north-eastern end of Laurie Island in the South Orkney Islands of Antarctica.

Etymology
At the same time, the French name (in English form but misspelled "Cape Vallavielle") was transferred to the point now described. The name Cape Valavielle has been retained for the prominent cape, as applied by d'Urville, on the basis of priority and wide usage. For the sake of historical continuity, the UK Antarctic Place-Names Committee in 1954 recommended that the name Buchanan Point be applied to the point now described.

Important Bird Area
The site has been identified as an Important Bird Area (IBA) by BirdLife International because it supports a breeding colony of about 10,000 pairs of chinstrap penguins.

References 

Laurie Island
Headlands of the South Orkney Islands
Important Bird Areas of Antarctica
Penguin colonies